Miroslav Kasaj (born 11 March 1988) is a Slovak football midfielder who currently plays for Sereď.

Club career

FC Spartak Trnava
He made his professional debut for FC Spartak Trnava against FC ViOn Zlaté Moravce on 13 July 2014.

References

External links
 FC Spartak Trnava profile
 
 Eurofotbal profile
 Futbalnet profile

1988 births
Living people
Slovak footballers
Association football midfielders
MFK Ružomberok players
FK Slovan Duslo Šaľa players
FC Spartak Trnava players
Slovak Super Liga players